For whiskers found on cats and other animals, see Whiskers. Cat's whiskers may also refer to:
Cat's-whisker detector, an electric component
Orthosiphon aristatus, a plant commonly known as cat's whiskers